Corndale may refer to:

 Corndale, New South Wales, a locality in the City of Lismore, Australia
 Corndale, Queensland, a locality in the South Burnett Region, Queensland, Australia
 Corndale, Victoria, a locality in the  Shire of Glenelg, Victoria, Australia